Doruhan-e Neqareh Khaneh (also Romanized as Dorūhān-e Neqāreh Khāneh; also known as Dorūhān and Dūrūhān) is a village in Kabgian Rural District, Kabgian District, Dana County, Kohgiluyeh and Boyer-Ahmad Province, Iran. At the 2006 census, its population was 555, in 107 families.

References 

Populated places in Dana County